Isaiah Gardner (born January 16, 1985) is a former Canadian football defensive back. He was signed by the Jacksonville Jaguars as an undrafted free agent in 2008. He played college football at Maryland.

College career
Gardner played college football for the University of Maryland, College Park after transferring from the University of Notre Dame after his freshman year.

Professional career

Jacksonville Jaguars
On April 27, 2008, he signed as an undrafted free agent with the Jacksonville Jaguars. After making the team following the preseason, he was inactive for the regular season opener against the Tennessee Titans on September 7. He was waived two days later after offensive tackle Chad Slaughter was signed, but re-signed to the practice squad the following day.

Gardner was promoted to the active roster on October 4 when offensive tackle Todd Wade was released. The Jaguars waived Gardner on October 25 to make room for safety Chad Nkang. Gardner was subsequently re-signed to the practice squad.

Gardner was again promoted to the Jaguars' active roster on December 10. He was waived again on December 22 and re-signed to the practice squad.

The Jaguars waived Gardner on May 4, 2009.

Edmonton Eskimos
On May 7, 2010, Gardner signed with the Edmonton Eskimos of the Canadian Football League. He was later released by the team on June 5, 2010.

Toronto Argonauts
On April 21, 2011, Gardner signed with the Toronto Argonauts of the Canadian Football League. He was released by the team on May 27, 2011.

Victaulic Company of America 

2018 - Hired to Fire Protection Sales active roster and is an active midget wrestler fanatic.

External links
Toronto Argonauts bio
Jacksonville Jaguars bio
Maryland Terrapins bio

1985 births
Living people
American football cornerbacks
Edmonton Elks players
Jacksonville Jaguars players
Maryland Terrapins football players
Notre Dame Fighting Irish football players
Sportspeople from Detroit
Players of American football from Detroit